is an inhabited island located in the Seto Inland Sea between Honshū and Shikoku. It is administratively part of the city of Kan'onji, Kagawa, Japan. It is famous for producing high-quality iriko (dried sardines). 

It has a population of 503 people as of 2018. Both electricity and water supply on the island are supplied from the mainland, and regular ships are in service from Maura Port on the south side of the island to the Shikoku mainland.

There are many steep cliffs around the island, forming a plateau, and houses are concentrated in the center of the island from north to south. Then islands have been inhabited since prehistoric times, and stone tools from the Jomon period have been found in archaeological excavations. The main economic activity is fishing and the processing of sardines, which are used as the base of the broth for Sanuki udon

References

External links

 Information about the island 

Islands of Japan
Geography of Kagawa Prefecture
Kan'onji, Kagawa